Eugene Garrett Bewkes IV is an American publisher, currently the publisher of National Review. Bewkes formerly served as the Senior Manager of Digital Strategy & Account Management for the New York Post.

Early life and education
Bewkes attended Eaglebrook School and Deerfield Academy in Deerfield, Massachusetts like other members of his family. His uncle is media executive Jeff Bewkes. He graduated from Colgate University in Hamilton, New York  with a degree in Peace and Conflict Studies. He also attended American University in Washington, D.C., earning a graduate certificate in Applied Politics.

Bewkes is gay and is married.

National Review
Bewkes joined National Review in 2016 with the mission of expanding the publication's reach. Two of his first projects were the reformatting of the publication's website with an eye towards accessibility, and the founding of "NRPlus", an exclusive paid-for community. In 2019, Bewkes was named to Ad Age's annual "40 under 40" list for his work at the publication. In 2020, Bewkes was given a similar recognition when Editor & Publisher Magazine named him to their list of "25 Under 35" list of young professionals.

References

Living people
American publishers (people)
Year of birth missing (living people)